The 124 Ridge Street Gallery was a collective gallery founded in New York's Lower East Side in 1985. Founding members were Susan Bachemin, Elizabeth Evers, Jane Fine, Matthew Harrison, Michael Kaniecki, Robert McGrath, Heidi Marben, Laurie Olinder, and Joe Vinson. Subsequent members included Amy Berniker, Ruth Pomerantz, Paul Rodriguez, Roger W. Sayre, Ann Shea, Paul Villinski and Carla Weisberg.

The gallery exhibited art and film from local artists and filmmakers during the 1980s East Village art gallery scene, including Matty Jankowski's 1987 mail art show "The Joke is in the Mail." The film screening series Film Crash was founded at the gallery.

The gallery was closed in 1997.

Artists exhibited 

 Michael Abrams
 John Artura
 Tony Atura
 Susan Bachemin
 Maija Beeton
 Amy Berniker
 Evan Brenner
 Daniel Brenner
 Craig Buckbee
 Liz Burns
 Monty Cantsin
 Lauren Chambers
 David Chelsea
 Torture Chorus
 Linus Corraggio
 Sumner Crane
 David Crocker
 Tim Cruse
 Anita Curtis
 Verne Dawson
 Tasha Depp
 Jack Desalvo
 Tracey Dillon
 Jeremy Dine
 Tony DiTerlizzi
 Kate Donnelly
 Lauren Doster
 Eileen Doster
 Leonard Drew
 Matthew Droege
 Osno Endo
 Jim Esber
 Elizabeth Evers
 Madge Evers
 Steve Fairchild
 Toma Fichter
 Jane Fine
 Guilbert Gates
 Darroch Greer
 Rudolph Grey
 Melinda Hackett
 Beth Handler
 Matthew Harrison
 Steven Harvey
 Christy Herron
 Joe Herzfeld
 Bill Hobrecht
 Deborah Holcombe
 Carlton Holmes
 Tim Hunter
 Mizuho Ichioka
 Matty Jankowski
 Kate Johnson
 Michael Kaniecki
 Charles Kohlhase
 Isaac Kosman
 Brandon Krall
 Barbara Kriegh
 Robin Levine
 David Licht
 Bill Lynch
 Anne-Marie Macintyre
 Lisa Mann
 Heidi Marben
 Jerry Marks
 Mill McArthur
 Robert McGrath
 Eva Melas
 Tim Milk
 James Monteith
 Ista Mueller
 Adelaide Murphy
 Kestutis Nakas
 Steve Niccolls
 Joe Nunas
 Karl Nussbaum
 Laurie Olinder
 Sarah Oliphant
 Douglas Padgett
 Ethan Phillips
 Jack Pierson
 Jonathan Pierson
 Ruth Pomerantz
 Condy Poorbaugh
 Juan Puntes
 Margaret Riegel
 Mark Rixon
 Rick Rodine
 Paul Rodriguez
 Scott Saunders
 Roger W. Sayre
 David Schlegel
 John Seigurt
 Dan Sevigny
 Ann Shea
 Walter Sipser
 Mary-Paige Snell
 Robert Sussman
 Stow Takeishi
 Tom Venditti
 Paul Villinski
 Joe Vinson
 Melissa Weaver
 Carla Weisberg
 Mike Wilson
 Suzanne Winkler
 Greg Woolard
 Dan Zippi

Sources

Defunct art museums and galleries in Manhattan
1985 establishments in New York City
1997 disestablishments in New York (state)
Art galleries established in 1985